Bone Brothers and similar can mean:
Bone Brothers, a USA music group
Bone Brothers (album), a music album which they released
Bone Brothers 2, the second release by the Bone Thugs-N-Harmony side project made up of Layzie Bone and former member Bizzy Bone
Bone Brothers 3, their third, independently released album